Joseph Leopold Wirthlin (August 14, 1893 – January 25, 1963) was the eighth presiding bishop of the Church of Jesus Christ of Latter-day Saints (LDS Church).

Wirthlin was born in Salt Lake City, Utah Territory. He served as a missionary in the church's Swiss–German Mission in 1913 and 1914. He served as bishop of the Salt Lake 33rd Ward in the Liberty Stake from 1928 to 1935. On October 27, 1935, the Liberty Stake was split and the Bonneville Stake was organized with Wirthlin as its first president. He was set apart by Joseph Fielding Smith.

Wirthlin became a general authority in 1938 when he was called as a counselor to LeGrand Richards in the presiding bishopric. In 1952, LDS Church president David O. McKay called Wirthlin to be the church's eighth presiding bishop. Wirthlin called Thorpe B. Isaacson and Carl W. Buehner as his counselors. Wirthlin and his counselors served until 1961.

Wirthlin died in Salt Lake City, Utah, at LDS Hospital of heart failure, and was buried at Salt Lake City Cemetery.

Wirthlin and his wife, Madeline Bitner, were the parents of five children, including Joseph B. Wirthlin, who served as a member of the church's Quorum of the Twelve Apostles. Their other children were Judith Wirthlin Parker; Gwendolyn Wirthlin McConkie; Richard B. Wirthlin, a former general authority; and David Bitner Wirthlin, a former president of the church's Nauvoo Illinois Temple.

See also

 Council on the Disposition of the Tithes

References

External links
Grampa Bill's G.A. Pages: Joseph L. Wirthlin

1893 births
1965 deaths
American general authorities (LDS Church)
American Mormon missionaries in Germany
American Mormon missionaries in Switzerland
Clergy from Salt Lake City
Counselors in the Presiding Bishopric (LDS Church)
20th-century Mormon missionaries
Presiding Bishops (LDS Church)
Burials at Salt Lake City Cemetery
Latter Day Saints from Utah